The First Turn-On! is a 1983 American comedy film directed by Lloyd Kaufman and Michael Herz of Troma Entertainment. It was the last in a series of four "sexy comedies" that helped establish Troma as a film studio, starting with 1979's Squeeze Play!, 1981's Waitress! and 1982's Stuck on You!.

The First Turn-On! is usually considered by Troma fans to be the best of the company's "sexy comedies".

This was Vincent D'Onofrio's film debut.

Plot
On the last day of summer at Camp Big-Tee-Pee, all the teenage campers are crazy with hormones and eager to go home. While on a nature walk with ditzy hippie camp counselor Michelle Farmer, four students - self-proclaimed stud Mitch, his girlfriend Annie, overweight Henry, and nerd Danny - break off from the rest of the group to indulge in some cannabis. They take refuge in a nearby cave, only to be caught in the act by Michelle some time later. While being shooed out, Henry's flatulence causes a landslide, trapping the five of them inside. To pass the time until their eventual rescue, the group shares stories of how each lost their virginity.

In Mitch's story, Lucy, an elegant prostitute, picks up Mitch while he is hitchhiking and invites him to visit her fancy hotel room. Feeling nervous and inexperienced, he asks his ultra-cool, yet dim-witted friend Jeff to give him pointers (which include "when in doubt, whip it out"). However, upon meeting Lucy, Jeff unsuccessfully attempts to seduce Lucy, almost injuring her. When Mitch saves her and kicks Jeff out, Lucy repays him with mind-blowing sex.

Henry is forced to tell his story next. In preparation for a big Halloween party, he dresses as a ghost. Unfortunately, in addition to not being able to see out of the eye-holes, the costume looks identical to a Klan robe. Blinded, he accidentally stumbles upon a group of (flamboyantly gay) African-American thugs about to kill a young white woman. The thugs turn their attention to Henry, beat him senseless, and then skip off, singing and holding hands. The girl, convinced Henry has just saved her life, instantly falls for him and the two make passionate love later that night next to a giant pile of donuts.

Meanwhile, the camp's staff, in fear of a potentially expensive lawsuit, desperately search for the missing campers.

In Annie's story, she discusses her first time, back when she was working on her family's farm. One night, she discovers an attractive drifter who had broken into her house in search of food. Overwhelmed by her hormones, she gives him a lot more than cookies in the back of the barn, much to the dismay of the sheep.

Danny goes next: His flashback reveals that he was a pornography-addicted loser. While visiting the beach one day, he thinks he sees Penthouse Pet Sheila Kennedy smiling and winking at him, but quickly dismisses it as a mirage. Later that night, after being rejected from a double date with his brother, Danny returns to his room to find Kennedy waiting for him. While the two engage in lengthy foreplay, they are later joined by his brother's girlfriend, and they all participate in an orgy, which Danny mispronounces.

Finally, Miss Farmer tells her story: Back in high school she was deeply in love with her psychotic, nerd boyfriend Dwayne. However, when Dwayne dumps her for another girl at the junior prom, she sucks up her pride and picks up two new boyfriends. The three of them proceed to have sex on a bowling alley lane.

As more time passes and oxygen diminishes in the cave, the gang becomes convinced that they will all asphyxiate. In a moment of truth, everyone admits that their stories were false. They are all still virgins. Determined not to die as such, they all participate in an orgy. The symphony of thrusts and moans causes another landslide, thus opening the entrance of the cave and freeing everyone.

As the group returns to camp, a narrator reveals the character's futures: Danny became a pornographic actor under the name "Dicky Long". Mitch became a priest and a staunch advocate of gay rights. Henry now works for the National Cheese Commissioners Board. After eight marriages, Annie had a nervous breakdown and became a vegetable. Miss Farmer runs the government's program for Wildlife Preservation. The film's final shot shows her trying to make a large trout "fly away" by tossing it into the air.

Re-release
The film was re-released on DVD in late 2009, with new interviews with Lloyd Kaufman and Michael Herz as well as new special features and an old Kaufman/Herz movie as an easter egg.

External links

1983 films
1980s sex comedy films
American independent films
American sex comedy films
Films about virginity
Films directed by Lloyd Kaufman
Films about summer camps
Troma Entertainment films
Teen sex comedy films
1983 comedy films
1980s English-language films
1980s American films